The 11th Biathlon European Championships were held in Minsk, Belarus, from February 18 to February 22, 2004.

There were total of 16 competitions held: sprint, pursuit, individual and relay both for U26 and U21.

Results

U26

Men's

Women's

U21

Men's

Women's

Medal table

External links 
 IBU full results
 All results

Biathlon European Championships
International sports competitions hosted by Belarus
2004 in biathlon
2004 in Belarusian sport
Sports competitions in Minsk
Biathlon competitions in Belarus